Jajce underground chapel with the crypt, often refereed to as Jajce Catacombs, also Jajce underground church, or simply Jajce crypt in Jajce, Bosnia and Herzegovina, is historic burial site of Hrvoje Vukčić, a Bosnian nobleman who founded the city and ordered construction of the underground chapel with the crypt around 1400, which was finished before 1416, in time for his burial. The crypt was also meant to serve as the family's burial site.

Location
The underground complex is located on the south-western part of the Walled city of Jajce, in the town's quarter just below the plateau between the Medvjed-kula and the church Church of Saint Mary and its belltower of Saint Luke. Other important religious buildings and facilities were built on the location throughout the history, such as Franciscan friary, a graveyard, and a separate tower for their defence. At first this zone of the town was outside the town's ramparts, but walls encompassed it after second and third phase in fortification's upgrade during the 15th century.

History

The first reference to Jajce in written sources dates back to 1396, when Hrvoje Vukčić Hrvatinić is mentioned as the count of Jajce (conte di Jajcze), and under whom the town underwent considerable political and cultural development, at the turn of the 14th and 15th centuries.

The underground structure, now  historic monument, was built around 1400, but earlier then 1416 when Grand Duke of Bosnia, Hrvoje Vukčić, who founded the city of Jajce and ordered its construction, died and was lied down into his tomb. The is an underground structure, conceived to be a church, with a narthex, baptistery with a baptismal fonts, a nave, and a presbytery with an altar space. The structure is south–north oriented, with the entrance from the southern end.
The underground complex was rock-cut into a live rock  this two-level crypt is small and roughly hewn but artfully half-lit and notable for the boldly sculpted cross, sun and crescent moon motifs (downstairs), a rare surviving memorial to the independent Bosnian Church.

Tito is said to have hidden here during 1943, and signed documents from the second AVNOJ meetings.

Architectural description

The underground spaces are entered through a small and narrow lobby, whose door are also cut into the live rock. In the late 19th or early 20th century, this entrance into the Catacombs was vaulted with an above-ground stone porch, which was conceived as a protection from elements.
There are unfinished carved figures on the lobby's rockface on the both sides of the door, just in front of the narthex. On the left is a male figure, probably holding a spear in his right hand, and in his left he holds a lowered sword. To the left, next to a figure, hardly discernible, there is a depiction of what appears to be a heraldic image, with a large helmet and a mantle descending behind the shield, or was supposed to be the top of the helmet, from which springs a hand bent at the elbow with a sword.
It seems that this unfinished heraldic depiction was meant to represent the ducal coat of arms of Hrvoje Vukčić. On the other side is also a carved representation of a female figure with a heraldic sign in her left hand, most likely a fleur-de-lis.

From the middle of the main room, through a rectangular pit, four steep steps descend into a crypt, 3.92 with 4.22 m, and height 1.90 to 2.20 m. The entire central stage is occupied by an altar with a perforation in the rockface in the shape of a double cross, a crescent moon and the sun, just like those in the burial vault designated as D in the church. The following is technical architectural description of the complex:

The narthex is a narrow space measuring 2.18 m by 5.50 m, partly stone walled and with a barrel vault. From the narthex a passage leads through a low, narrow aperture with a semi-cylindrical vault, cut out from the thick wall which enters into the main area.
The first section is a baptistery measuring 7.50 m by 2.05 m, or 9.50 m including the baptismal fonts in the transepts to left and right of this space (designated C in the floor plan), above which there are arched apertures. In the right side corner there is a stone seat with three round holes cut in it to hold holy water fonts.
The church nave (main body) measures 2.80 m by 4.00 m. Along the side walls there are burial vaults in the floor, with arched openings about 1.20 m. deep (D). On the left side of the church vault is completed (D). A double cross is cut in the rockface at the bottom of this vault, with the sun and crescent moon to its sides. The left side vault is completely recessed and is 2 m. deep. Hollow space to the right (D) is only 20 cm deep, and the initial depths of the hole beneath it is only 10 cm, indicating that it's unfinished. Both side walls of the church's nave extends towards the presbytery, ending in three semi-columns (designated area E). The baptistery and the nave to the presbytery are vaulted with a barrel vault that turns in the center into a pointed vault with a height of 4.15 m. The pointed section has been given a smooth finish.
The presbytery is narrow 2.94 m by 10.66 m. The entire front section along the entire length of the presbytery is roofed over by a long, narrow, shallow vault. A deep and spacious altar stands at the end, with an empty altar apse is roofed with a pointed arch. There is a hollow on either side, from which the procelium is also covered by pointed arches (designated I). The hollow on the right side is complete, with a window on each lateral side, while the left side hollow remained unfinished, with only the depth and procelium hollowed out. On both sides of the altar part of a narrow passage has been cut out (G), most likely as a passage around the apse, but it's unfinished (designated K). Going across the presbytery, this passage was linked with space designated as F, and is probably also intended to serve as a burial vault. On the left side, passage G and a hole F are barely visible.

National monument

By the Decision No. 06-6-742/03 of the Commission to Preserve National Monuments of Bosnia and Herzegovina, from 21 January 2003, the historic monument of the Catacombs in Jajce is protected as a national monument.

See also
Jajce Mithraeum

References

External links

Burial sites of Bosnian noble families
History of Jajce
Buildings and structures in Jajce
Catacombs